The 2001 Torneo Descentralizado, was the 85th season of the top category of Peruvian football (soccer). It was played by 12 teams. The national champion was Alianza Lima.

Competition modus 
The national championship was divided into two half-year tournaments, the Torneo Apertura and the Torneo Clausura. Each was played on a home-and-away round-robin basis. The winners of each tournament played for the national title in a two-legged final. Should the same team have won both tournaments, they would have been automatic champions.

Qualification to CONMEBOL's Copa Libertadores was won by each tournament winner and the winner of a play-off between the teams that placed second in each tournament. The bottom team on the aggregate table was relegated, while the eleventh placed team played a relegation/promotion play-off against the winner of the Segunda División (Second Division).

Teams

Torneo Apertura

Apertura play-off 

Alianza Lima Apertura 2001 winnersTo 2002 Copa Libertadores(Sporting Cristal to Copa Libertadores play-off)

Torneo Clausura

Clausura play-off 

Cienciano Clausura 2001 winnersTo 2002 Copa Libertadores(Estudiantes to Copa Libertadores play-off)

Copa Libertadores play-off

Season finals

Title

Aggregate table

10th/11th place play-off

Promotion play-off

Top scorers 
21 goals
 Jorge Ramírez (Wanka)
19 goals
 Paul Cominges (Estudiantes de Medicina)
18 goals
 Johan Fano (Unión Minas, Sport Boys)
17 goals
 Jorge Soto (Sporting Cristal)
16 goals
 Luis A. Bonnet (Sporting Cristal)
 Pedro Ascoy (Juan Aurich)

Footnotes

External links 
 Peru 2001 season Details on RSSSF

Peruvian Primera División seasons
Peru
Primera Division Peruana